This is a list of notable record labels based in New Zealand. 

 Arch Hill Recordings
 Capital Recordings
 Dawn Raid Entertainment
 Dirty Records
 DO IT Records
 Failsafe Records
 Flying Nun Records
 Illegal Musik
 King Worldwide
 Lil' Chief Records
 Lost By Design Records
 Meltdown Records
 Onset/Offset
 Propeller Records
 She'll Be Right Records
 Siren Records
 Uprising Records
 Wildside Records
 Xpressway
 Zodiac Records

See also

 List of record labels

New Zealand
Record labels